The list of shipwrecks in August 1915 includes ships sunk, foundered, grounded, or otherwise lost during August 1915.

1 August

2 August

3 August

4 August

5 August

6 August

7 August

8 August

9 August

10 August

11 August

12 August

13 August

14 August

15 August

16 August

17 August

18 August

19 August

20 August

21 August

22 August

23 August

25 August

26 August

28 August

29 August

30 August

31 August

References

1915-08
 08